Justo J. Iturralde (20 December 1905 – 27 October 1981) was an Argentine equestrian. He competed in two events at the 1948 Summer Olympics.

References

External links
 

1905 births
1981 deaths
Argentine male equestrians
Argentine dressage riders
Olympic equestrians of Argentina
Equestrians at the 1948 Summer Olympics
Pan American Games medalists in equestrian
Pan American Games silver medalists for Argentina
Pan American Games bronze medalists for Argentina
Equestrians at the 1951 Pan American Games
Place of birth missing
Medalists at the 1951 Pan American Games